Wonseong of Silla (r. 785–798, died 798) was the 38th to rule the Korean kingdom of Silla.  He was a twelfth-generation descendant of King Naemul.  His father was Kim Hyo-yang, and his mother was Lady Gye-o, the daughter of Park Chang-do.  Wonseong's queen was Lady Yeonhwa, the daughter of Gakgan Kim Sin-sul.

Wonseong of Silla ruled out the Resolution of the Ji-jeong with the Yang-sang in 780 before becoming king. He killed Hyegong of Silla and contributed to the throne. From this point of view, he is a figure closely related to his appearance and has been opposed to the monarchy of the royal family since King Gyeongdeok. Hyegong of Silla was appointed to Sangdaedeung in 780 (King Seongdeok 1) for his work to calm down the turmoil at the end of King Hyegong's reign. 

In 780, Wonseong fought alongside his kinsman Kim Yang-sang to defeat the rebellion of Kim Ji-jeong.  The rebellion left King Hyegong dead, and Kim took the throne as King Seondeok.  The new king gave Wonseong the title of sangdaedeung.  After Seondeok died without an heir, the nobles chose Wonseong as the new king.

In 787, Wonseong sent tribute to Tang China and requested a title.  In 788, he established the national civil service examination for the first time, on the Tang model.

After his death in 798, the king was buried south of Bongdeoksa.

Family
Parents
Father: Kim Hyo-yang (김효양)
Mother: Lady Gye-o (계오부인박씨), the daughter of Prak Chang-do (박창근)
Consorts and their respective issue:
  Queen Kim (Lady Yeonhwa)(숙정부인 김씨), of the Kim clan, the daughter of Gakgan Kim Sin-sul (김신술)
Son: Prince Hyechung (혜충태자) (750–791/792), posthumously named King Hyechung (혜충왕) 
Daughter-in-law: Queen Seongmok, of the Kim clan ( 성목태후 김씨)
Grandson: Soseong of Silla (died 800) (소성왕)—was the 39th to rule the Korean kingdom of Silla.
Grandson: Heondeok of Silla (died 826) (헌덕왕) –was the 41st to rule the Korean kingdom of Silla (흥덕왕)
Grandson: Kim Chung-gong (김충공)–the father of King Minae of Silla, Queen Munmok
Grandson: Heungdeok of Silla (777–836) (흥덕왕)–was the 42nd ruler of the Korean kingdom of Silla. 
Daughter-in-law: Concubine Park (포도부인 박씨)
Grandson: Huigang of Silla (died 838)(희강왕)–) was the 43rd ruler of the Korean kingdom of Silla
Grand-daughter: Princess Gwibo (귀보부인)
Son: Prince Uiyeong (의영; d.794), postumosly named Crown Prince Heonpyeong  (헌평태자) 
Grandson: Prince Sungbin (숭빈)
Son: Prince Ye–yeong (예영), postumosly named King Hyegang (혜강왕) 
Grandson: Prince Heonjeong (김헌정)
Grandson: Prince Kim Gyun-jung (김균정)
Grand-daughter: Madam Gwiseun (귀승부인)– became Queen Consort of Heondeok of Silla
Daughter: Princess Daryong (대룡부인) 
Daughter: Princess Soryong (소룡부인)

See also
Unified Silla
List of Korean monarchs
List of Silla people

References

Silla rulers
798 deaths
Year of birth unknown
8th-century Korean monarchs